Parliamentary elections were held in the Czech Republic on 8 and 9 June 1990 alongside federal elections. They were the first elections after the Velvet Revolution and voter turnout was 97%.

Following the elections, a coalition government was formed by Civic Forum, the Movement for Autonomous Democracy–Party for Moravia and Silesia and Christian and Democratic Union with Petr Pithart as Prime Minister.

Opinion polls

Graphical summary

Results

References

Legislative elections in Czechoslovakia
Legislative election
Elections to the Chamber of Deputies of the Czech Republic
Czech